Ballylarkin Church, also called Ballylarkin Abbey, is a medieval church and National Monument in County Kilkenny, Ireland.

Location

History

The region was controlled by the Ó Lorcáin until they were ousted by the Anglo-Norman Shorthalls (Schortal) in 1326. James Schortal and his wife Catherine White built the church, a small single-room structure, at Ballylarkin in 1350.

A triple sedilia was later inserted into the south wall in the 14th century. A sheela-na-gig was originally at Ballylarkin but has been moved to the National Museum of Ireland – Archaeology.

Church

The church was fortified with a chemin de ronde and a small north entrance. It has a Gothic cut stone window.

There is a triple sedilia in the south wall. Along the top of the north and south walls is a series of corbel-stones with tracery. Beside the sedilia is a piscina with quatrefoil basin. There is an ambry beside the east window.

Gallery

References

Churches in County Kilkenny
Archaeological sites in County Kilkenny
National Monuments in County Kilkenny
Former churches in the Republic of Ireland
1350 in Ireland
1350 establishments in Europe